White Cottage may refer to:

White Cottage, California, now Howell Mountain, an unincorporated community
White Cottage (Natchez, Mississippi), a historic house
White Cottage, Ohio, an unincorporated community